Francisco Rueda may refer to:

Francisco Rueda (diver) (born 1958), Mexican diver
Francisco Rueda (footballer) (born 1983), Mexican footballer